Oak Hill Cemetery is a historic  cemetery located in the Georgetown neighborhood of Washington, D.C., in the United States. It was founded in 1848 and completed in 1853, and is a prime example of a rural cemetery. Many famous politicians, business people, military people, diplomats, and philanthropists are buried at Oak Hill, and the cemetery has a number of Victorian-style memorials and monuments. Oak Hill has two structures which are listed on the National Register of Historic Places: the Oak Hill Cemetery Chapel and the Van Ness Mausoleum.

The cemetery's interment of "Willie" Lincoln, deceased son of president Abraham Lincoln, was the inspiration for the Man Booker Prize-winning novel Lincoln in the Bardo by George Saunders.

History 
Oak Hill began in 1848 as part of the rural cemetery movement, directly inspired by the success of Mount Auburn Cemetery near Boston, Massachusetts, when William Wilson Corcoran (also founder of the Corcoran Gallery of Art) purchased  of land. He then organized the Cemetery Company to oversee Oak Hill; it was incorporated by act of Congress on March 3, 1849.

Oak Hill's chapel was built in 1849 by noted architect James Renwick, who also designed the Smithsonian Institution's Castle on Washington Mall and St. Patrick's Cathedral, New York. His one-story rectangular chapel measures 23 by 41 feet (7×12 m) and sits on the cemetery's highest ridge. It is built of blue gneiss, in Gothic Revival style, with exterior trim in the same red Seneca sandstone used for the Castle.

By 1851, landscape designer Captain George F. de la Roche finished laying out the winding paths and terraces descending into Rock Creek valley. When initial construction was completed in 1853, Corcoran had spent over $55,000 on the cemetery's landscaping and architecture.

On October 4, 2022, historic preservationist Paul K. Williams became the cemetery's 14th Superintendent in residence and COO of the Oak Hill Cemetery Historic Cemetery Foundation.

Notable interments 

 Dean Acheson
 Madeleine Albright
 Gamaliel Bailey
 Margaret Lucy Shands Bailey
 James G. Blaine (formerly interred)
 Ben Bradlee
 William P. Burch
 Adolf Cluss
 Lorenzo Dow
 Peggy Eaton
 Katherine Graham
 Herman Hollerith
 Willie Lincoln (formerly interred)
 Edwin P. Parker Jr.
 Paul J. Pelz
 Charles Anthony Schott
 E. D. E. N. Southworth
 Edwin M. Stanton

In popular culture 
 The cemetery is the setting of the 2017 George Saunders novel Lincoln in the Bardo. 
 The cemetery was a part of the plot in the David Baldacci novel The Camel Club.
 A tomb in the cemetery is described as the site of a dead drop in the John Le Carre novel The Perfect Spy.
 The cemetery was a part of the plot in the Brad Meltzer novel The Inner Circle

Photo gallery

References

Bibliography

External links

 National Register of Historic Places Travel Itinerary
 

1848 establishments in Washington, D.C.
Botanical gardens in Washington, D.C.
Cemeteries in Washington, D.C.
Georgetown (Washington, D.C.)

Rural cemeteries